Shamel is a Goan percussion instrument.

Shamel may also refer to:

Shamel Jones, American collegiate basketball player and streetball player
Frank Shamel (1912–1994), American basketball player
H. Harold Shamel (1886–1963), American mammalogist

See also
Shamel Bazar, a village in Polan Rural District, Polan District, Chabahar County, Sistan and Baluchestan Province, Iran
Shamil (disambiguation)
Chamel, a given name and surname